Hroch is a 1974 Czechoslovak comedy film directed by Karel Steklý. The film was meant as a political satire that would be a parable of Prague Spring. The film was notable for negative reception, and is often viewed as the worst Czech film ever made.

Cast
 Oldo Hlavácek as Hroch
 Helga Cocková as Dása
 Svatopluk Matyás as Pip Karen
 Helena Blehárová as Sona
 Miroslav Homola as Borovec
 Zdena Hadrbolcová as Plasilová
 Eduard Dubský as Prof. Fibinger
 Jirí Lír as Keeper
 Slávka Budínová as Majka
 Josef Vetrovec as Zoo Director
 Oldřich Velen as Veterinary
 Josef Kobr as Bank Director
 Jiří Holý as Husband of Sona
 Jan Skopeček as Dentist

Hroch Awards
Hroch is often called the worst Czech film ever made. Hroch awards that are annually given by the words Czech film of the year are named after the film.

References

External links
 

1974 films
1974 comedy films
Czechoslovak comedy films
1970s Czech-language films
Films directed by Karel Steklý
Czech comedy films
1970s Czech films